The 2018 Men's Indoor Hockey World Cup was the fifth edition of this tournament and played from 7 to 11 February 2018 in Berlin, Germany. The Netherlands were the reigning champions, but did not return to defend their title due to their poor performance at the 2016 European Indoor Championship.

Austria defeated Germany in the final after penalties to win their first title, while Iran secured their first medal.

Qualification
Twelve teams qualified to participate in the tournament.

Umpires
12 umpires were appointed by the FIH for this tournament.

Diego Barbas (ARG)
Lee Barron (ENG)
Adam Barry (AUS)
Daniel Denta (DEN)
Bart de Liefde (NED)
Michael Eilmer (AUT)
Donny Gobinsingh (TRI)
Ben Göntgen (GER)
Aliaksandr Hrachou (BLR)
Pawel Linkowski (POL)
Luis Martínez (ESP)
Ayden Shrives (RSA)

Results
The schedule was released on 19 September 2017.

All times are local (UTC+1).

First round

Pool A

Pool B

Second round

Quarter-finals

Eleventh and twelfth place

Ninth and tenth place

First to fourth place classification

Semi-finals

Third and fourth place

Final

Final standings

Awards

Goalscorers

See also
2018 Women's Indoor Hockey World Cup

References

External links
Official website
FIH website

Men's Indoor Hockey World Cup, 2018
World Cup
Indoor Hockey World Cup Men
Indoor Hockey World Cup
International indoor hockey competitions hosted by Germany
Sports competitions in Berlin